Kampong Bahru Bus Terminal (Malay: Pertukaran Bus Kampong Bahru; Chinese: 甘榜峇鲁路巴士终站) is a bus terminal in Singapore. It is situated along Spooner Road off Kampong Bahru Road in Bukit Merah, and is located near Outram Community Hospital, as well as the Singapore General Hospital.

History

According to The Straits Times, historically there was a bus terminal located within Radin Mas named Kampong Bahru Bus Terminal. The former bus terminal bears no relation to the contemporary bus terminal of the same name.
 
The current iteration of Kampong Bahru Bus Terminal was first announced on 23 May 2016, and was constructed and built on land formerly owned by Malayan Railways. The construction of the new bus terminal was intended to replace the former New Bridge Road Bus Terminal, as the site would later be redeveloped into a new elective surgery centre by the Singapore General Hospital. The bus terminal was originally slated for opening by the end of 2017, but it was then delayed to March 2018.

Opening
The terminal officially began operations on 10 March 2018, with existing services from New Bridge Road Bus Terminal amended to serve the bus terminal on that day. The terminal is located about 500 metres from the former site of New Bridge Road Bus Terminal.

References

External links
 Interchanges and Terminals (SBS Transit)

Bus stations in Singapore